Andre Rush is an American celebrity chef and military veteran. Rush worked in the White House as a Chef for four administrations. Rush, a retired Master Sergeant of the US Army, gained attention for his large biceps and muscular physique.

Life

Rush grew up in Columbus, Mississippi. He played football in the position of running back at Lee High School in Columbus. He holds a bachelor's degree in Business Management from Trident University International, an associate degree in Hotel Restaurant Management from Central Texas College and an associate degree from Culinary Stafford University.

Rush enlisted as active duty in the US Army in 1993. He has been deployed several times, and has served as a trainer in hand-to-hand combat and food service. In 1997, he began to cook at the White House. He has served the presidential administrations of Bill Clinton, George W. Bush, Barack Obama, and Donald Trump. He worked at the White House part-time while simultaneously working at The Pentagon. He was in the gym of the Pentagon when it was hit during the September 11, 2001 attacks, and chose to volunteer for combat duties afterwards.

In June 2018, Rush received fame when he was photographed by CNN reporter Kate Bennett and Wall Street Journal reporter Vivian Salama preparing a Ramadan meal for a White House dinner. The photo of him cooking on the White House lawn during the annual White House Iftar dinner circulated on Twitter, and subsequently went viral. Later that year, Rush signed a deal to produce a television show entitled Chef in the City. He has since left his job as a White House chef.

In 2020, Rush attended the opening of a Salvation Army in Harrisburg, Pennsylvania, whereupon they gave him a celebration of service award.

Rush was a member of the U.S. Army Culinary Arts Team. In addition to cooking, Rush's other pursuits include ice carving, motivational speaking and life coaching.

Fitness 
Rush is known for his physique and large 24 inch biceps that gave him notoriety on social media. As a high school senior he reportedly could bench press  while weighing just . In 2010, he was reported to be able to bench press . Rush states he does 2,222 pushups daily as part of the 22 pushup challenge, with the goal to raise awareness for the roughly 22 veterans who die by suicide every day.

In 2021, Men's Health published an article featuring Rush's daily routine, which included him eating eight meals a day and up to 10,000 calories. Some of his claims were received with skepticism by the professional bodybuilding community.

References

External links
Official Website
Cooking with White House chef Andre Rush (video) - WUSA9 
White House Chef Andre Rush talks taking care of your mental, physical health (video) - KXTV

1974 births
Living people
American chefs
People from Washington, D.C.
Central Texas College alumni
United States Army non-commissioned officers
White House chefs
African-American chefs
21st-century African-American people
20th-century African-American people